Bengo is a province of Angola. Its capital is Caxito. It has an area of 31,371 square kilometres, and its population as of the 2014 Census was 356,641. The province was created in 1980 by dividing the original province of Luanda into Bengo and a new smaller province of Luanda.

Geography
The province is bordered by the provinces of Zaire to the North, Uige to the Northeast, Cuanza Norte to the East, and Cuanza Sul to the South. It has two western coastal stretches along the Atlantic Ocean, and forms an enclave around the national capital's province of Luanda. The Kissama National Park and the Kibinda Forest Reserve are here. The province also has a number of lakes, most of them are in the municipalities of Dande and Icolo and Bengo. There are lagoons at Panguila and Ibendoa, Cabiri and Ulua do Sungui.

Municipalities

Since the territorial reform of July 2011
The Angolan National Assembly approved a law on July 27, 2011 reorganizing the territorial subdivisions of Luanda and Bengo Provinces
.

The law moved the Icolo e Bengo and Quiçama municipalities from Bengo Province to Luanda Province and created new municipalities in both provinces. Now, Bengo Province is divided into six (6) municipalities:

Before the territorial reform of 2011

The province of Bengo contained five (5) municipalities (municípios):

Since 2011, Icolo e Bengo and Quiçama have been moved to Luanda Province.

Some sources show the following municipalities in Bengo Province: Bula-Atumba, Dembos and Pango-Aluquém; while others list those three in Cuanza Norte (Kwanza Norte) province.

Communes 
The province of Bengo contains the following communes (comunas); sorted by their respective municipalities:

 Ambriz Municipality:– Ambriz, Bela Vista, Tabi
 Bula-Atumba Municipality: – Bula Atumba, Quiage (Kiage)
 Dande Municipality: – Barra do Dande, Caxito, Mabubas, Quicabo (Kikabo), Úcua
 Dembos Municipality: – Paredes, Piri, Quibaxe (Kibaxe), São José das Matas
 Nambuangongo Municipality: – Cage (Kage), Canacassala (Kanacassala), Gombe, Muxaluando (Muxiluando), Quicunzo (Kicunzo), Quixico (Kixico), Zala
 Pango-Aluquém Municipality: – Cazuangongo (Kazuangongo), Pango-Aluquém
 Ícolo e Bengo Municipality: – Bom Jesus do Cuanza, Cabiri (Kabiri), Caculo Cahango, Calomboloca (seat: Cassoneca), Catete
 Quiçama Municipality: – Cabo Ledo, Demba Chio, Mumbondo, Muxima, Quixinje (Kixinje)

Natural resources and geology 
Bengo is known for its abundant fish, with fishing communities along the coast.  Late Cretaceous fossils are known from this region, including unique turtles (Angolachelys) and the first dinosaur fossil skeleton from Angola: the Angolatitan.

List of governors of Bengo

See also
Fortress of Muxima

References

External links
 Official website of province governor
 Information on this province at the Angolan ministry for territorial administration
 Information on this province at Info Angola
 
 US government statistics from 1988
  from Info-Angola
 - Defence Minister's visit 
 Province geographical info at geoview.info

 
Provinces of Angola
Luanda Province